Abdullah Ali Alewa (born 1947– ) is a Yemeni politician and military officer. He served previously as chief of staff of Yemen Armed Forces and Minister of Defense.

Early life and education 
He was born in 1947 in Haban, Shabwah governorate. He grew up and studied his basic and elementary education in Aden. He obtained a master's degree in Military Sciences from Air Academy in Kyiv in 1977.

Career 

 Com of the Air Force and Air Defense, South Yemen
 Chief of Staff of the Army, South Yemen
 Deputy Minister of Defense, South Yemen
 Com of Al-Jawf Axis, Governor of Al-Jawf Governorate, 1992
 Com of Shabwa Axis, 1994
 Chief of Staff of Yemen Armed Forces, 1994
 Minster of Defense, 2001
 Advisor to Supreme Com of the Yemeni Armed Forces, 2006

References 

1947 births
20th-century Yemeni military personnel
Yemeni military officers
21st-century Yemeni military personnel
Defence ministers of Yemen
People from Shabwah Governorate
Governors of Al Jawf
20th-century Yemeni politicians
Living people
First Bajamal Cabinet
Second Bajamal Cabinet